Zeng Bing is an engineer at the University of Electronic Science and Technology of China (UESTC) in Sichuan, China. He was named a Fellow of the Institute of Electrical and Electronics Engineers (IEEE) in 2016 for his contributions to image and video coding.

References 

Fellow Members of the IEEE
Academic staff of the University of Electronic Science and Technology of China
Chinese engineers
Living people
Year of birth missing (living people)